Connecticut's 42nd House of Representatives district elects one member of the Connecticut House of Representatives. It currently consists of the town of Preston and parts of Ledyard and Montville.  It has been represented by Democratic Keith Denning  since 2023.

Recent elections

2022

2020

2018

2016

2014

2012

References

42